The 1972 Texas Tech Red Raiders football team represented Texas Tech University in the Southwest Conference (SWC) during the 1972 NCAA University Division football season. In their third season under head coach Jim Carlen, the Red Raiders compiled an 8–4 record (4–3 against conference opponents), tied for second place in the SWC, and outscored opponents by a combined total of 282 to 188. The team's statistical leaders included Joe Barnes with 1,142 passing yards, George Smith with 740 rushing yards, and Andre Tillman with 285 receiving yards. The team played its home games at Clifford B. & Audrey Jones Stadium.

Schedule

References

Texas Tech
Texas Tech Red Raiders football seasons
Texas Tech Red Raiders football